The 1947 New Hampshire Wildcats football team was an American football team that represented the University of New Hampshire as a member of the Yankee Conference during the 1947 college football season. In its second year under head coach Bill Glassford, the team compiled an 8–1 record (4–0 against conference opponents), won the Yankee Conference championship, and outscored opponents by a total of 255 to 59. The team's only loss was to the Toledo Rockets in the second annual Glass Bowl game. The team played its home games at Lewis Field (also known as Lewis Stadium) in Durham, New Hampshire.

This was the inaugural season of competition in the Yankee Conference, which had been formed in December 1946. Quarterback Bruce Mather led the team on offense, which used a T formation scheme. Mather, back Carmen Ragonese, and tackle Clayton Lane were each selected in the 1948 NFL Draft.  Ragonese, Mather, co-captain Ernest Rainey, and co-captain Lane were each inducted to the university's athletic hall of fame in 1982, 1984, 1986, and 1988, respectively; the 1947 team was inducted as a whole in 2001.

Schedule

Wildcat co-captain Clayton Lane went on to play in one professional football game, with the New York Yankees of the All-America Football Conference in 1948. He later was a civil engineer in the United States Army Corps of Engineers for 32 years; he died in January 2000 at age 77. Co-captain Ernie Rainey became a salesman and later vice president of sales for Stihl chainsaws; he died in November 2011 at age 89.

References

Further reading
 
 

New Hampshire
New Hampshire Wildcats football seasons
Yankee Conference football champion seasons
New Hampshire Wildcats football